Psalm 69 is the 69th psalm of the Book of Psalms, beginning in English in the King James Version: "Save me, O God; for the waters are come in unto my soul". It is subtitled: "To the chief musician, upon Shoshannim, a Psalm of David". The Book of Psalms is part of the third section of the Hebrew Bible, and a book of the Christian Old Testament. In the slightly different numbering system used in the Greek Septuagint version of the Bible and in the Latin Vulgate, this psalm is Psalm 68. It has 36 verses (37 in Hebrew verse numbering).

Several verses from Psalm 69 are quoted in the New Testament. It forms a regular part of Jewish, Catholic, Lutheran, Anglican and other Protestant liturgies.

Text

Hebrew Bible version 
Following is the Hebrew text of Psalm 69:

King James Version

Uses

Judaism
Verse 7 is found in the repetition of the Mussaf Amidah on Rosh Hashanah:
"Because for Your sake I have borne reproach; shame has covered my face".
Verse 14 is recited before the Torah service at Shabbat Minchah.  
Verses 14 and 32 are recited in the blessings before the Shema on the second day of Rosh Hashanah.

New Testament
This psalm is quoted or referred to in several places in the New Testament:
In John 2:17, when Jesus had expelled the money changers from the Temple, his disciples remembered the words of verse 9a: "zeal for Your house has eaten me up".
In John 15:25, Jesus related his rejection by the Jews to fulfilment of the Jewish law: "This happened that the word might be fulfilled which is written in their law, 'They hated Me without a cause'." (Psalm 69:4 NKJV)
Jesus was given gall or vinegar to drink when he was crucified (Matthew 27:34, 48); Mark 15:36; Luke 23:36; John 19:28–29), recalling Psalm 69:3 ("my throat is dry") and Psalm 69:21: "They also gave me gall for my food, and for my thirst they gave me vinegar to drink."
In Acts 1:20, referring to the Field of Blood where Judas Iscariot committed suicide: "For it is written in the Book of Psalms: 'Let his dwelling place be desolate, and let no one live in it'". (Psalm 69:25 NKJV)
Paul quotes verses 22–23 also quoting Psalm 109:8, in Romans 11:9–10: "Let their table become a snare and a trap, a stumbling block and a recompense to them. Let their eyes be darkened, so that they do not see, and bow down their back always."
Paul quotes verse 9b in Romans 15:3: "Christ did not please Himself; but as it is written, 'The reproaches of those who reproached You fell on Me'."

Orthodox Christianity
Psalm 69 is read during the Compline prayers.

Book of Common Prayer
In the Church of England's Book of Common Prayer, Psalm 69 is appointed to be read on the evening of the 13th day of the month.

Musical settings 
Heinrich Schütz set Psalm 69 in a metred version in German, "Gott hilf mir, denn das Wasser dringt", SWV 166, as part of the Becker Psalter, first published in 1628.

The King James Version of verse 20 of Psalm 69 is cited as text in the English-language oratorio "Messiah" by George Frideric Handel (HWV 56).

Royal National Lifeboat Institution
Verse 15, "Let not the deep swallow me up", is inscribed on the reverse side of the gallantry medal issued by the Royal National Lifeboat Institution, the lifeboat service of the United Kingdom and Republic of Ireland.

See also
Old Testament messianic prophecies quoted in the New Testament

References

External links 

 
 
 Text of Psalm 69 according to the 1928 Psalter
 Psalms Chapter 69 text in Hebrew and English, mechon-mamre.org
 For the leader; according to “Lilies. / Of David. / Save me, God, / for the waters have reached my neck. text and footnotes, usccb.org United States Conference of Catholic Bishops
 Psalm 69:1 introduction and text, biblestudytools.com
 Psalm 69 – Rescued from Deep Waters enduringword.com
 Psalm 69 / Refrain: Hide not your face from your servant, O Lord. Church of England
 Psalm 69 at biblegateway.com

069
Works attributed to David